"Good Lovin' (Makes It Right)" is a song written by Billy Sherrill and recorded by American country music artist Tammy Wynette.  It was released in June 1971 as a single from her compilation album Tammy's Greatest Hits, Volume Two.  The song was Wynette's ninth number one on the country chart.  The single stayed at number one for two weeks and a total of  spent fifteen weeks on the country chart.

Chart performance

References

1971 singles
Tammy Wynette songs
Songs written by Billy Sherrill
Song recordings produced by Billy Sherrill
Epic Records singles
1971 songs